Laidley North is a rural locality in the Lockyer Valley Region, Queensland, Australia.

History 
The locality was named on 3 June 1994. Its name is derived from the town name of Laidley, which itself derives from the naming of Laidleys Plain by explorer Allan Cunningham after James Laidley New South Wales Deputy Commissary General.

Laidley North Mixed State School opened on 1 April 1889. In 1897 the name was changed to Laidley North State School. A secondary department operated from 1964 to 1984 (after which a separate Laidley State High School opened in 1985 on another site). Laidley North State School closed on 12 December 1998, but Laidley District State School (an amalgamation of Laidley North State School and Laidley Central State School) opened on the Laidley North State School site in 1999. This school is now within the boundaries of Laidley at 218-220 Patrick Street.

References 

Lockyer Valley Region
Localities in Queensland